Bulat Ayratovich Sadykov (born 9 May 1995) is a Russian football player. He plays for FC Irtysh Omsk.

Club career
He made his debut in the Russian Football National League for FC Akron Tolyatti on 1 August 2020 in a game against FC Fakel Voronezh, as a starter.

Personal life
His older brother Aizat Sadykov also played professionally.

References

External links
 
 Profile by Russian Football National League
 

1995 births
Sportspeople from Tatarstan
People from Naberezhnye Chelny
Living people
Russian footballers
Association football defenders
FC KAMAZ Naberezhnye Chelny players
FC Orenburg players
FC Zenit-Izhevsk players
FC Zvezda Perm players
FC Akron Tolyatti players
FC Nosta Novotroitsk players
FC Irtysh Omsk players